Rothbury is a small town located in the Hunter Region of New South Wales, Australia. It is 10 km from Cessnock. At the 2011 census, Rothbury had a population of 452 people. North Rothbury is another small settlement about 5km to the northeast. The town is 8 km from Pokolbin's vineyards.

The name of Rothbury became notorious for the Rothbury Riot when police shot into a crowd of miners killing Norman Brown and injuring many more, during a lockout of miners at the local colliery on 16 December 1929. A monument in honour of Norman Brown is located at North Rothbury.

References

Towns in New South Wales
Suburbs of Singleton Council
Suburbs of City of Cessnock
Mining towns in New South Wales